Batman: The Lazarus Syndrome is a 1989 BBC Radio 4 broadcast, produced to celebrate the 50th anniversary of the popular comic book character Batman. The story was originally written by Simon Bullivant and Dirk Maggs. It contains references to such Batman stories as Batman: The Killing Joke, Batman: A Death in the Family, Batman: Year Three, and Batman: Son of the Demon. Michael Gough, who provides the voice of Alfred Pennyworth, also played the same role on screen in the films Batman, Batman Returns, Batman Forever and Batman & Robin.

Story 
On the anniversary of his parents' murder, Batman visits the location of their deaths and is set upon by an old enemy, who has had surgery to look like Bruce Wayne. The battle seems won until an explosion puts Batman on the missing list. With the disappearance of the Batman, Commissioner Gordon begins searching for any lead, even going as far as arranging meetings with The Joker and Catwoman. Meanwhile, in Wayne Manor, Bruce Wayne informs Alfred and Nightwing that he is retiring from vigilantism. But at the same time the true Batman awakens in the custody of Talia al'Ghul and must regain his strength and awareness before this impostor uses Wayne Enterprises to bring ruin to the world.

The events of this story are set after A Death in the Family and The Killing Joke, but before Tim Drake is introduced.

Cast 
 Bob Sessions as Batman / Bruce Wayne
 Michael Gough as Alfred Pennyworth
 Paul Maxwell as Commissioner Jim Gordon
 Garrick Hagon as Ra’s al Ghul / Thomas Wayne
 Kerry Shale as Nightwing / Dick Grayson / The Joker / Detective Harvey Bullock / Batcave Computer
 Shelley Thompson as Barbara Gordon / Young Bruce Wayne
 Lorelei King as Catwoman / Talia / Martha Wayne
 Alan Marriott as Robin / Jason Todd

Sequel 
Many of the cast members returned for the 1992 drama Batman: Knightfall.

1989 audio plays
BBC Radio 4 programmes
BBC Radio dramas
British radio dramas
1989 radio programme debuts
1989 radio programme endings
Batman radio series